Vincent Massey Park is an urban park along the Rideau River in the Confederation Heights neighbourhood of Ottawa, Ontario, Canada, accessible via Heron Road. It is extensively used in the summer for family and group picnics.

The park has wooded walking paths, rolling meadows, scenic vistas, open grassy areas for playing sports, and picnic tables. Available amenities include washrooms, pathways, water fountains, bandstand, two softball diamonds, electrical hook-ups, and barbecue pits.

It is named after Charles Vincent Massey, 18th Governor General of Canada.

Authority
Vincent Massey Park is managed and within the jurisdictional authority of The National Capital Commission of Canada (NCC).

Monuments 
The Canadian Labour Congress has officially established April 28 as the Day of Mourning to workers killed and injured on the job. The National Day of Mourning monument was dedicated by the Canadian Labour Congress on April 28, 1987, in Vincent Massey Park.

See also 
 List of Ottawa parks

References 

Parks in Ottawa